Keleriškiai is a village in Kėdainiai district municipality, in Kaunas County, central Lithuania. According to the 2011 census, the village has a population of 351 people.

Demography

References

Villages in Kaunas County
Kėdainiai District Municipality